Daggubati Venkatesh, credited as Raja, is an Indian actor turned businessman who has acted in Tamil, Malayalam and Telugu language films. The actor made his debut in the 1981 Tamil film, Paakku Vethalai, before going on to become a leading actor in the Tamil film industry from 1986 to 2000.

He went on to play second lead roles and supporting characters in several films including Kamal Haasan's Sathi Leelavathi and Rajinikanth's Mappillai. He has also acted in few Telugu films like Chinnari Sneham, Sankellu and Shri Krishnarjuna Vijayam.

He is a relative of veteran film producer late D. Ramanaidu.

Career 
A nephew of Telugu film producer D. Ramanaidu, Daggubati Venkatesh was persuaded by his family to become an actor in Tamil cinema owing to his familiarity with Madras. He subsequently joined Bharathiraja's acting school, where he trained before getting his first major career breakthrough with the director's romantic drama Kadalora Kavithaigal (1986). To differentiate from his namesake cousin, Venkatesh was given the screen name "Raja". The box office success of Kadalora Kavithaigal prompted Bharathiraja to cast him again in Vedham Pudhithu (1987), and the popular song "Kannukkul Nooru" earned Raja a large female fanbase.

Raja continued portraying supporting roles in films, and was unable to garner much success as a lead actor. His appearance in a negative role in his collaboration with Manivannan for Ini Oru Suthanthiram was well received by critics, though his best known work in the late 1980s and early 1990s featured him in supporting roles such as in Mappillai (1989) and Pudhu Vasantham (1990). In the early 1990s, he was often typecast in soft, demure characters often portraying a gentle romantic, who regularly lost out to film's lead actor. His most notable films of the period, Sathi Leelavathi (1995), Love Birds (1996) and Kadhal Kottai (1996) all featured him in similar roles. He quickly became disheartened at the films and secondary characters being offered to him, and opted to move into business in 1999. and currently runs a granite business called "Cosmo Granites" in Chennai.

After nineteen years break from films, Raja returned to acting with a role in Krish's biopic drama N.T.R: Kathanayakudu (2019), where he portrayed the supporting role of Trivikrama Rao. He made his return to Tamil films through Adithya Varma (2019), where he appeared as the father of the titular character played by debutant Dhruv Vikram.

Filmography

References

External links 
 

1965 births
20th-century Indian male actors
Indian male film actors
Living people
Male actors in Malayalam cinema
Male actors in Tamil cinema
Male actors in Telugu cinema